Tim Harries (born 1959) is a British bass player, who has played with various folk rock and jazz bands in his career.

Biography
Harries studied music at the University of York, graduating in 1981 before going on to study double bass with Tom Martin at the Guildhall School of Music. He was a member of Bill Bruford's Earthworks from 1989 to 1993, during his time with Bruford he performed with a band billed as Yes on TV program Kathy Lee and Regis, the musicians, consisting of Steve Howe (guitar, vocals), Bill Bruford (drums) and Harries (bass, backing vocals), performed the first two verses and chorus of Roundabout, this performance was later described as a "car-crash" by Loudersound in 2022. Harries was a member of folk rock band, Steeleye Span from 1989 to 2001, he contributed bass, keyboards and vocals and later guitar after the return of long time bassist, Rick Kemp. Since leaving Steeleye Span he has worked as a session musician for Brian Eno, Katie Melua, Film Composers David Holmes and Stephen Warbeck, writer Alan Moore, on the audio CD version of Moore's comic book novel Angel Passage (2001), and others. He can be heard on the soundtracks of films including Heart (1999), Quills (2000) and Perrier's Bounty (2009).

Discography 
Iona
- Iona (1988)
- Journey into the Morn (1996)
- Woven Cord (1999)
Bill Bruford's Earthworks
- Dig? (1989)
- All Heaven Broke Loose (1991)
- Stamping Ground (1994)
Steeleye Span
- Tempted and Tried (1989)
- Time (1996)
- Horkstow Grange (1998)
- Bedlam Born (2000)
London Philharmonic Orchestra
- The Symphonic Music of Yes (1993) - With Jon Anderson, Steve Howe, Bill Bruford, etc.
Dr Didg
- Out of the Woods (1995)
- Serotonality (1998)
Peggy Seeger
- Odd Collection (1996)
- Love Will Linger On (2000)
Fernhill
- Whilia (1997)
- Hynt (1999)
The Hungry Ants
- Formic (1998)
- Myrmidoms (2001)
Eddi Reader
- Angels & Electricity (1998)
- Simple Soul (2001)
Julie Murphy
- Lilac Tree (1999)

June Tabor
- An Echo of Hooves (1999)
- At the Wood's Heart (2005)
- Apples (2007)
1651
- Cast a Bell (2002)

Mike Westbrook
- Chanson Irresponsible (2002)
- Turner In Uri (2003)

Katie Melua
- Call Off the Search (2003)
- Piece by Piece (2005)
- Pictures (2007)
- The House (2010)
Ben Castle
- Blah St (2004)
Dave Bainbridge
- Veil of Gossamer (2004)

Charlie Beresford
- The Room is Empty (2005)
- Dark Transport (2009)
Petra Jean Phillipson
- Notes on Love (2005)
Spin Marvel
- Spin Marvel (2006) See Martin France.
- The Reluctantly Politicised Mr James (2010)
Duke Special
- Songs from the Deep Forest (2006)

Katia Melua

 Piece by piece (2006)
Tom McRae
- King of Cards (2007)
Roger Chapman
- One More Time For Peace (2007)
David Byrne and Brian Eno
- Everything That Happens Will Happen Today (2008)

David Holmes
- The Holy Pictures (2008)

Mandyleigh Storm
- Fire & Snow (2008)

References

External links

English bass guitarists
English male guitarists
Male bass guitarists
Steeleye Span members
English session musicians
Alumni of the University of York
1959 births
Living people
British folk rock musicians
Earthworks (band) members